Chavroux is a French factory produced soft cheese made using goat's milk.

The cheese is sold, most usually, in small containers in the form of a truncated pyramid, each of 150 g, or in the form of a cylinder. It can be eaten all round the year and is recommended for eating with salads, but can also be used with any meal as a form of cheese spread.

The business is owned by Bongrain, a producer of a wide range of specialist cheeses and France's second largest cheese producer overall.

See also
 List of goat milk cheeses

External links
 Presentation of the Chavroux brand (in French) 
 Chavroux.be Chavroux Belgian website (in Dutch/Flemish or French)
 Qui veut du Fromage, Apparently commercial website providing more than 400 recipes using cheese (in French)
 Bongrain, Official international website of the manufacturer

References 

French cheeses
Goat's-milk cheeses